Cecylia Vetulani (11 April 1908 – 2 January 1980) was a Polish art historian and conservator-restorer who did research mostly in the field of Warmia and Masuria folk art. She was a custodian of the Museum of Warmia and Mazury in Olsztyn (1950–1956).

Biography 
She was the daughter of an engineer, Franciszek Vetulani (1856−1921), and Katarzyna Ipohorska-Lenkiewicz (1868−1915). She graduated from Academy of Fine Arts in Warsaw in 1932. In 1935 she obtained licensing for teaching in high schools and started to work as a teacher. During World War II she lived in Warsaw with her sister Maria and nephew Witold. She took part in the Warsaw Uprising. In the spring of 1945 she moved to Olsztyn, where she decided to live and work.

She was a conservator at the Museum of Warmia and Mazury; she secured and catalogued various antiques and did restoration works. In 1950 she became a custodian of the Museum. Since 1956 she worked at the antique shop in Olsztyn. She retired in 1959 as a disabled person.

She was the author of several works on folk art and regional history, and she published articles in such periodicals as „Słowie na Warmii”, „Warmia i Mazury”, „Przegląd Zachodni” and „Polska Sztuka Ludowa”. In 1972 she published her memoir titled Pionierzy i zabytki (Pioneers and Monuments) that focused mostly on her work in the Museum. For her services in cultural heritage protection in the region she was awarded with a Gold Medal „For Antiques' Guardians”.

References

Bibliography 
 Tadeusz Oracki: Twórcy i działacze kultury w województwie olsztyńskim w latach 1945–1970. Olsztyn: Ośrodek Badań Naukowych im. Wojciecha Kętrzyńskiego, 1975, pp. 99–101.
 Kamila Wróblewska: Cecylia Vetulani (1908–1980). „Komunikaty Mazursko-Warmińskie”, 1/1980, pp. 119–120.

Polish art historians
Polish antiquarians
Conservator-restorers
Writers from Kraków
Polish people of Italian descent
1908 births
1980 deaths
Women art historians
Academy of Fine Arts in Warsaw alumni
20th-century Polish historians
20th-century women writers
20th-century antiquarians